The 1982 Primera División de Fútbol Profesional season.  At the end of the regular season, the top 4 teams took part in a Final series.
ATletico  were named Champions after defeating Independiente 3-0 on aggregate over a two leg series.

Teams

Managerial changes

During the season

League standings

Playoffs

Semifinals 1st Leg

Semifinals 2nd Leg

Final

Top scorers

List of foreign players in the league
This is a list of foreign players in 1982 Seasons. The following players:
have played at least one apetura game for the respective club.
have not been capped for the El Salvador national football team on any level, independently from the birthplace

Atletico Marte
 None

Agave
  

C.D. Águila
  Ademir Barbosa

Alianza F.C.
  

Chalatenango
  

FAS
  Manolo Alvarez

 (player released mid season)
  (player Injured mid season)
 Injury replacement player

Independiente
  

Luis Ángel Firpo
  

Once Lobos
  Byron Pérez 
  Óscar La “Coneja” Sánchez 
  Erwin Donis 
  Jorge La “Chana” Fernández

Santigueno
  

UES
  Harry Ramon Bran

External links
 

1982
1982–83 in Salvadoran football